Nehra is a Jat surname. Notable people with the surname include:

 Ashish Nehra (born 1979), Indian cricketer and coach
 Jagdish Nehra ( 1943–2023), Indian politician

See also
 Neha

Indian surnames